Srinath Narasimhan (born 8 July 1962) is an Indian business executive. He was the CEO of Tata Trusts and former Managing Director & Chief Executive Officer of Tata Teleservices, an Indian broadband and telecommunications service provider and part of the business conglomerate Tata Group. Narasimhan joined the Tata Group in 1986, and has also served as the CEO of two other group companies, Tata Communications and Tata Internet Services.

Narasimhan holds a degree in mechanical engineering from Indian Institute of Technology Madras and an MBA from Indian Institute of Management Calcutta.

See also
 Tata Teleservices
 Tata Communications

References

Living people
Indian Institute of Management Calcutta alumni
Indian chief executives
1962 births
Tata Group people